The All Nepal National Independent Students Union (Sixth) is a students organisation in Nepal. It is the students wing of the Rastriya Janamorcha. As of 2009, the organization had branches in 59 of the 75 districts of Nepal.

References

External links 
 ANNISU(6th) website

Student wings of political parties in Nepal
Student wings of communist parties
Students' unions in Nepal